Law enforcement in Austria is the responsibility of the Directorate General for Public Security, a subdivision of the Federal Ministry of the Interior located at Herrengasse 7 in Vienna. Over 20,000 police officers are on duty in the Federal Police at more than 1,000 police stations. On lakes and rivers the federal police has over 70 boats and other craft to act as the water police.

Law enforcement agencies

Federal

Ministry of Defence
Military Police: the military police of the Austrian Armed Forces

Ministry of Finance
Financial Police: the uniformed law enforcement arm of the Ministry of Finance 
Customs Service

Ministry of the Interior
The Ministry of the Interior is responsible for:
Federal Bureau of Anti-Corruption 
Directorate General for the Public Security 
Criminal Police Office
Federal Police: divided into 83 district police commands and 27 city police commands
Einsatzkommando Cobra (EKO Cobra): federal SWAT and special forces unit
Air Police: responsible for law enforcement in the air, including the provision of police helicopters

Ministry of Justice 
Judicial Guard: responsible for running prisons and providing security at court facilities

State
In general, the nine States of Austria do not operate state law enforcement agencies, except in their specific areas of competence, namely nature conservation and wildlife protection.
Tyrol
Tyrolean Mountain Guards enforce conservation and wildlife protection laws in the state of Tyrol.

Municipalities

Some Austrian municipalities operate a form of municipal law enforcement agency. In some municipalities, this is known as the City Police, or sometimes Community Police or Community Security Guard. In others, responsibility for policing lies with the federal government and municipalities cannot call these agencies "police", instead naming them "order offices", similar in function to a bylaw enforcement officer or code enforcement. In some cases, these organisations are established as private corporations, owned by the municipality, such as the Security Service of Linz.

Requirements for police officers
Police officers in Austria must meet certain requirements. These requirements include being at least 18 years of age, Austrian citizenship, an ability to act (not burdened by physical disability), impeccable reputation, Class B driver's licence, if conscripted to the armed forces, to have completed that conscription, and a swimming badge to prove swimming ability.

See also 
Anti-corruption agency
Crime in Austria
List of law enforcement agencies

References

External links
 Bundeskriminalamt
 Polizei